KZK or kzk may refer to

 Air Kazakhstan (ICAO airline code KZK)
 Kazhakuttam railway station (station code KZK), Trivandrum, Kerala, India
 Kazukuru language (ISO 639 code kzk)
 Kazakovite (mineral symbol Kzk), see List of mineral symbols
 Kasautii Zindagii Kay (2001 TV series), an Indian soap opera
 Kasautii Zindagii Kay (2018 TV series), reboot of the 2001 series

See also